American Heart may refer to:

American Heart (film) directed by Martin Bell (1993)
"American Heart" (song) by Faith Hill (2012)
 American Heart (album) by Adrenalin (1984)
American Heart, 2017 novel by Laura Moriarty

See also
American Hearts, album by  A.A. Bondy
American Hearts (card game), an alternative name for Black Lady
Heart of America (disambiguation)